Yahad or Yachad (lit. Together) may refer to:

Israel
Yachad (political party), a political party in Israel
Yahad (defunct political party), a now-defunct political party in Israel formed by Ezer Weizman in 1984
Yahad, Israel, an unrecognised kibbutz in northern Israel
Meretz, a political party in Israel formerly known as Yahad

Elsewhere
Yachad (NGO), a non-governmental organisation in the United Kingdom
Yahad in unum, a French association whose main task is to locate mass graves of Jews killed between 1941 and 1944 in Ukraine and Belarus and finding witnesses
Yachad (organization), a non governmental organization in the United States for Jewish people with disabilities.